was a Japanese computer scientist, known for his influential contributions to theoretical computer science, as well as for the development of Japanese keyboard layouts, a challenging practical problem. From 1972 to 1991, he was professor of the formal languages division at the Department for Information Science at the University of Tokyo.

Work
In the field of theoretical computer science, Yamada introduced the notion of real-time computability. As his colleague Aravind Joshi recalls:

Selected publications
 
 
 Hisao Yamada: "A Historical Study of Typewriters and Typing Methods: from the Position of Planning Japanese Parallels", Journal of Information Processing, 2(4) (February 1980), pp. 175–202

References
 Deaths: Dr. Hisao Yamada, SEAS. University of Pennsylvania Almanac 55(2), p. 3
 History, University of Tokyo, Department of Information Science

External links

Japanese computer scientists
Theoretical computer scientists
1930 births
2008 deaths